Parry Sound—Muskoka is a provincial electoral district in the Canadian province of Ontario.

The riding was once held by Ontario Premier Ernie Eves, and at present by Norm Miller, son of former Premier Frank Miller.

The district, which has existed since 1999, has identical boundaries to those of the federal district of Parry Sound—Muskoka.

The riding consists of the Territorial District of Parry Sound (excluding the Town of Powassan, the townships of Nipissing and North Himsworth, and the part of the Town of Killarney contained in the district), the District Municipality of Muskoka, and the part of the Town of Kearney lying in the Territorial Nipissing District.

History

Prior to the 1999 boundary realignment two ridings covered the area: Parry Sound and Muskoka. Parry Sound—Muskoka provincial electoral district was created in 1906, Ontario was divided into the same electoral districts as those used for federal electoral purposes. They were redistributed whenever a readjustment took place at the federal level.

It initially consisted of the District Municipality of Muskoka, the Territorial District of Parry Sound (excluding the towns of Powassan and Trout Creek and the townships of Nipissing, North Himsworth and South Himsworth) and the township of Sherborne and Others (formerly Sherborne, McClintock, Livingstone, Lawrence and Nightingale) in the County of Haliburton.

In 2005, legislation was passed by the Legislature to divide Ontario into 107 electoral districts, beginning with the next provincial election in 2007. The eleven northern electoral districts are those defined for federal purposes in 1996, based on the 1991 census (except for a minor boundary adjustment). The 96 southern electoral districts are those defined for federal electoral purposes in 2003, based on the 2001 census. Without this legislation, the number of electoral districts in northern Ontario would have been reduced from eleven to ten.

Members of Provincial Parliament

Election results

2007 electoral reform referendum

Notes

Sources
 Elections Ontario
1999 results
2003 results
2007 results
Map of riding for 2018 election

Ontario provincial electoral districts
Bracebridge, Ontario
Huntsville, Ontario
Parry Sound, Ontario
Constituencies established in 1999
1999 establishments in Ontario